The Seely Creek Guard Station in Utah was built in 1907-1908.

See also
Great Basin Research Station Historic District

References

United States Forest Service ranger stations